Skypark Airport  is a public use airport located three nautical miles (6 km) southwest of the central business district of Bountiful, a city in Davis County, Utah, United States. It is privately owned by Skypark Airport Assoc., LLC.

Facilities and aircraft 
It has one asphalt paved runway designated 17/35 which measures 4,700 by 70 feet (1,433 x 21 m).

For the 12-month period ending December 31, 2007, the airport had 75,912 aircraft operations, an average of 207 per day: 99.8% general aviation and 0.2% air taxi. At that time there were 225 aircraft based at this airport: 87% single-engine, 8% multi-engine and 5% helicopter.

References 

Skypark Airport operates the FBO at Skypark Airport.

External links 
 

Airports in Utah
Buildings and structures in Bountiful, Utah
Transportation in Davis County, Utah